Eva Navarro may refer to:
 Eva Navarro (painter)
 Eva Navarro (footballer)